Andrea Solari (also Solario) (1460–1524) was an Italian Renaissance painter of the Milanese school. He was initially named Andre del Gobbo, but more confusingly as Andrea del Bartolo
a name shared with two other Italian painters, the 14th-century Siennese Andrea di Bartolo, and the 15th-century Florentine Andrea di Bartolo.

His paintings can be seen in Venice, Milan, The Louvre and the Château de Gaillon (Normandy, France). One of his better-known paintings is the Madonna with the Green Cushion (c. 1507) in the Louvre.

History 

Solario was born in Milan.  He was one of the most important followers of Leonardo da Vinci, and brother of Cristoforo Solari, who gave him his first training whilst employed extensively on work at the Milan cathedral, and at the Certosa di Pavia. In 1490 he accompanied his brother to Venice, where he seems to have been strongly influenced by Antonello da Messina, who was then active in the city. The fine portrait of a Venetian Senator (currently at the National Gallery of London) displays Antonello's plastic conception of form and was probably painted about 1492. The two brothers returned to Milan in 1493. The Ecce Homo at the Poldi-Pezzoli Museum, notable for its strong modelling, may have been painted soon after his arrival.

Solari's earliest dated work is a Holy Family and St. Jerome (at the Brera Gallery), with a fine landscape background, executed at Murano in 1495. It was the original work that influenced Correggio's painting, The Holy Family with Saint Jerome in 1515. The Leonardesque type of the Madonna proves that Andrea after his return from Venice, became strongly influenced by the great Florentine artist, who was then carrying everything before him. To this period of Andrea belong a small Crucifixion (1503, at the Louvre) and the portrait of Charles d'Amboise (Louvre); the portrait of Giovanni Longoni (1505, National Gallery of London); the Annunciation (1506, Fitzwilliam Museum, Cambridge); and the beautiful Madonna with the Green Cushion (Louvre), for which a sensitive drawing of the Virgin's head is in the Biblioteca Ambrosiana at Milan; and the Head of the Baptist in a silver charger (1507, Louvre).

In 1507 Andrea Solari went to France with letters of introduction to the Cardinal of Amboise, and was employed for two years on frescoes in the chapel of his castle of Gaillon in Normandy. According to Giovanni Morelli's suggestion, the artist may have visited Flanders before returning to his native country, and this may account for the Flemish character of his later work.

The artist was back in Italy in 1515, the date of the Flight into Egypt (Poldi-Pezzoli Collection) with its harmonious and detailed landscape background. To this period belong the Procession to Calvary (Borghese Gallery, Rome); the portrait of the Chancellor Domenico Morone (Palazzo Scotti, Milan); and the Woman playing a guitar (at the National Gallery of Ancient Art, Rome).

Andrea's last work was an altarpiece representing The Assumption of the Virgin for the Certosa di Pavia, left unfinished at his death and completed by Bernardino Campi about 1576.

Works
 Portrait of a Young Man, c. 1490, oil on panel, 31x28 cm, Madrid, Thyssen-Bornemisza Museum
 Madonna with Child, c. 1495, oil on panel, 30,5x27 cm, Milan, Poldi-Pezzoli Museum
 Man with a Pink Carnation, c. 1495, oil on panel, 50x39 cm, National Gallery of London
 Christ carrying the cross, 1495–1500, oil on panel, 34x26 cm, Brescia, Pinacoteca Tosio Martinengo
 Portrait of a Man, c. 1500, oil on panel, 42x32 cm, Milan, Brera Gallery
 Christ crowned with thorns, 1500–1505, oil on panel, 39x31 cm, Bergamo, Accademia Carrara
 Head of a Bearded Man, 1500–1510, black, red, and yellow chalk on brownish paper, New York, Metropolitan Museum
 Portrait of Giovanni Cristoforo Longoni, 1505, oil on panel, 79x60,5 cm, National Gallery of London
 Ecce Homo, 1505–1506, oil on panel, 43x33 cm, Milan, Poldi-Pezzoli Museum
 Ecce Homo, 1506-1507, oil on panel, 43x34 cm, Belgrade, National Museum of Serbia
 Lamentation over the Dead Christ, c. 1505-1507, oil on panel, 168x152 cm, Washington, National Gallery of Art
 Ecce Homo, 1505–1507, oil on panel, 57x44 cm, Oxford, Ashmolean Museum
 Portrait of Charles d'Amboise, c. 1507, oil on panel, 75x52 cm, Paris, Louvre
 The Head of Saint John the Baptist on a Charger, 1507, oil on panel, 46x43 cm, Paris, Louvre
 Madonna with the Green Cushion, 1507, oil on panel, 59x47 cm, Paris, Louvre
 Christ's flagellation, c. 1509, oil on panel, 63x45 cm, Philadelphia Museum of Art
 Madonna with Child, c. 1509, oil on panel, 27,2x27,9 cm, Milan, Poldi-Pezzoli Museum
 Woman playing the lute, c. 1510, oil on panel, 65x52 cm, Rome, Palazzo Barberini, Galleria Nazionale d'Arte Antica
 St Jerome in the desert, 1510–1515, oil on panel, 69x543 cm, County Durham, Bowes Museum
 St John the Baptist; St Anthony, 1512, oil on panel, 16x13 cm each, Milan, Poldi-Pezzoli Museum
 Christ carrying the cross, 1513, oil on panel, 45.5 x 34 cm, Nantes, Musée des Beaux-Arts
 Rest on the Flight into Egypt, 1515, oil on panel, 76x55 cm, Milan, Poldi-Pezzoli Museum
 Salome with the Head of St John the Baptist, 1520–1524, oil on panel, 58,5x57,5 cm, Vienna, Kunsthistorisches Museum
 Salome with the Head of St John the Baptist, ca. 1507–9, oil on wood, 57.2x47 cm, New York, Metropolitan Museum
 Blessing Christ, c. 1524, oil on panel, 203x130 cm, New York, Metropolitan Museum

Gallery

References

Further reading
 Brown, David Allen, Andrea Solario, Electa Mondadori, Milan (1987). 
 Brown, David Allen, et al., The Legacy of Leonardo: Painters in Lombardy, 1490-1530, Skira, Milan (1999).

External links

 
 Andrea Solario on Artcyclopedia
 Andrea Solari on Artnet
 Andrea Solario on Aparences
 Andrea Solario at the Museo Poldi-Pezzoli
 The Solaris and the Della Portas
 Leonardo da Vinci, Master Draftsman, an exhibition catalog from The Metropolitan Museum of Art (fully available online as PDF), which contains material on Solari (see index)
 Painters of reality: the legacy of Leonardo and Caravaggio in Lombardy, an exhibition catalog from The Metropolitan Museum of Art (fully available online as PDF), which contains material on Solari (see index)

1460 births
1524 deaths
15th-century Italian painters
Italian male painters
16th-century Italian painters
Painters from Milan
Italian Renaissance painters
Pupils and followers of Leonardo da Vinci